Puimre, also spelled Puyemrê, was an ancient Egyptian noble, architect and Second Priest of Amun during the reign of Thutmose III of the 18th Dynasty of Egypt. He was the son of Puia and Lady Nefer-iah, and had two wives: Tanefert and Sensonb.
His wife Sensonb was the daughter of Puimre's superior, the High Priest of Amun Hapuseneb and his wife Amenhotep. Sensonb served in the temple of Amun as a Divine Adoratrice.

Puimre's tomb – namely TT39 – is located in El-Khokha, part of the Theban Necropolis, on the west bank of the Nile, opposite to Luxor.

References

Priests of the Eighteenth Dynasty of Egypt
15th-century BC clergy